The Wanning-Yangpu Expressway, designated as G9813, is an expressway located in Hainan, China. The starting point is G98 Hainan Interchange, via Qiongzhong (Lingmen Junction in Qiongzhong and G9811 Haikou–Sanya Expressway is connected), with Danzhou reaching the end of Baimajing Interchange, connecting G98 Hainan Ring Road West Section and the Luzhou Yangpu Bridge connecting line.

References

Chinese national-level expressways
Expressways in Hainan
Transport in Hainan